MALLET is a Java "Machine Learning for Language Toolkit".

Description
MALLET is an integrated collection of Java code useful for statistical natural language processing, document classification, cluster analysis, information extraction, topic modeling and other machine learning applications to text.

History
MALLET was developed primarily by Andrew McCallum, of the University of Massachusetts Amherst, with assistance from graduate students and faculty from both UMASS and the University of Pennsylvania.

See also

External links 
 Official website of the project at the University of Massachusetts Amherst
 The Topic Modeling Tool is an independently developed GUI that outputs MALLET results in CSV and HTML files

Free artificial intelligence applications
Natural language processing toolkits
Free software programmed in Java (programming language)
Java (programming language) libraries
Data mining and machine learning software